The men's discus throw at the 1984 Summer Olympics in Los Angeles, California had an entry list of 20 competitors from 14 nations, with two qualifying groups before the final (12) took place on August 10, 1984. The maximum number of athletes per nation had been set at 3 since the 1930 Olympic Congress. The event was won by Rolf Danneberg of West Germany, the nation's first medal in the men's discus throw and the first victory by any German athlete in the event (East Germany had won two silvers, neither pre-war Germany nor the United Team had won any medals). Mac Wilkins and John Powell of the United States won silver and bronze; they were the eighth and ninth men to win multiple discus throw medals (both had medaled in 1976). The United States continued its 19-Games streak of earning at least one medal every time it appeared, missing the podium only in the boycotted 1980 Games; however, this would be the last Games in that streak—and, in fact, the last medals the United States would earn in the event through at least 2016.

Background

This was the 20th appearance of the event, which is one of 12 athletics events to have been held at every Summer Olympics. None of the finalists from the 1980 Games returned, many due to the Soviet-led boycott. The 1980 silver medalist Imrich Bugár of Czechoslovakia had won the first world championships in 1983, as well as the 1982 European championships; bronze medalist Luis Delís of Cuba was the 1983 Pan American champion; and fifth-place finisher Yuriy Dumchev of the Soviet Union set the world record in 1983. In their absence, the home nation American team was favored.

The Bahamas, Egypt, Mauritius, and Samoa each made their debut in the men's discus throw. The United States made its 19th appearance, most of any nation, having missed only the boycotted 1980 Games.

Competition format

The competition used the two-round format introduced in 1936, with the qualifying round completely separate from the divided final. In qualifying, each athlete received three attempts; those recording a mark of at least 62.00 metres advanced to the final. If fewer than 12 athletes achieved that distance, the top 12 would advance. The results of the qualifying round were then ignored. Finalists received three throws each, with the top eight competitors receiving an additional three attempts. The best distance among those six throws counted.

Records

Prior to the competition, the existing world and Olympic records were as follows.

No new world or Olympic records were set during the competition.

Schedule

All times are Pacific Daylight Time (UTC-7)

Results

Qualifying round

The qualifying round was held on August 8, 1984.

Final

See also
 1982 Men's European Championships Discus Throw (Athens)
 1983 Men's World Championships Discus Throw (Helsinki)
 1984 Men's Friendship Games Discus Throw (Moscow)
 1986 Men's European Championships Discus Throw (Stuttgart)
 1987 Men's World Championships Discus Throw (Rome)

References

External links
 Results

D
Discus throw at the Olympics
Men's events at the 1984 Summer Olympics